Jeneko Place (born 27 January 1994) is a Bermudian sprinter.

He finished fifth in the boys' 200 metres at the 2010 Summer Youth Olympics.

References

External links

1994 births
Living people
Bermudian male sprinters
Athletes (track and field) at the 2010 Summer Youth Olympics